Sir Frank James Fox (10 August 1874 – 1960) was an Australian-born journalist, soldier, author and campaigner, who lived in Britain from 1909.

Early life and education
Fox was born in 1874 in Adelaide, second son of Charles James Fox, one-time Latin teacher, journalist and editor of The Irish Harp and Farmers' Herald, and his wife Mary Ann, née Toole. He moved to Hobart in 1883, when his father became editor of the Tasmanian Mail, and was educated at Christ's College, Hobart. At an early age he wrote paragraphs for his father's paper.

Career
Fox was appointed editor of The Australian Workman in 1893, then in 1895 the (Bathurst) National Advocate, before joining The Age, where he served as chief of their reporting staff.
He joined the staff of the Sydney Bulletin in 1901 and was acting editor for a time.  As "Frank Renar", he published his first book Bushman and Buccaneer, a memoir of Harry Morant which became the seminal work for subsequent books, plays and the acclaimed film Breaker Morant.

While still working for the Bulletin, Fox served 1907–09 as first editor and manager of Lone Hand, a monthly publication of literature and poetry. Fox published a volume of political essays, From the Old Dog (Melbourne), in 1908. He was a keen horseman; riding out regularly with his literary colleagues Andrew Banjo Paterson and Norman Lindsay.  In spite of the latter describing him as an equine exhibitionist, Lindsay painted an equestrian portrait of Fox. This was considered highly unusual, as the subject matter is not in keeping with Lindsay's well-known works.

Lindsay wrote Bohemians of the Bulletin, which is illustrated with his doodles.

Fox was appointed as an assistant editor for the Morning Post in December 1909 and later in 1910, he was promoted as the news editor. He published Ramparts of Empire (1910) about the navy, Australia (1910), The British Empire (1911), Problems of the Pacific (1912) and many travel books.

Motivated by the atrocities he witnessed to the civilian population in Belgium whilst war correspondent for the Morning Post he was commissioned in the Royal Field Artillery on 13 December 1914, over age at 41, and served in France. He was twice wounded in the Battle of the Somme. In 1917-18 he was at the War Office working for Mi7, publishing "The Battle of the Ridges" and "The British Army at War" designed to educate the American Public about the British war effort.  He then served as Staff Captain at the Quartermaster General's branch, General Headquarters, in France, and wrote a contemporary account of life there ("GHQ"  Montreuil-sur-Mer).

Journalist

Australia (1892-1909)
 Editor: The Australian Workman.  Aged 18     
 Editor: National Advocate. Aged 21          
 Acting Editor: Sydney Bulletin       
 Founder: The Lone Hand (magazine)

England (1909-)
 Morning Post     
 News Editor 1910
 War Correspondent  –  1912 Bulgarian Army in Balkan War.
 War Correspondent  –  Belgian Army.  Aug – Dec 1914.  German Invasion. Reporting to Brussels re atrocities to civilian population (Order of the Crown of Belgium – in the gift of King Albert.)

Soldier 1905-1919
 Commissioned Australian Field Artillery 1905
 Commissioned RFA 1914/19  - Wounded twice at Somme 1916.
 War Office (1917).
 GHQ – Montreuil-sur-Mer.  Staff Officer in QMG Division; then War Office as Major,  (OBE Military; Mentioned in Dispatches) (1916-1919).

Author
Australian military historian Craig Wilcox, author of the book Australia's Boer War, Oxford University Press 2002 wrote:
Fox was a great man, and concerning Morant I think of him not only as the launcher of an Australian legend but also its subtlest and most intelligent storyteller; he confounds Morant’s champions as well as Morant’s detractors, as good literature and insider history ought to do. His little book ( Bushman and Buccaneer- A Memoir of Harry Morant) is often cited, sometimes plundered, but too rarely read.

Campaigner

Australia 
 Championed Australian Federation (as Editor of National Advocate)

Britain 
 Warned of Danger of War in Europe (1909-1914) and urged preparation – in Print and Public Platform
 MI7 (1917) to encourage US participation in WWI.
 As an Imperialist and a champion of Empire causes, organised:
 British Empire Cancer Campaign
 Empire Rheumatism Council
 Fellowship of British Empire Exhibition (for which he was Knighted - 1926)

Family and personal life
He married Helena Clint (d. 1958) on 13 June 1894; they had a son and two daughters.  Helena Clint was granddaughter of Alfred Clint, President of the Society of British Artists, great-granddaughter of George Clint ARA, and great-niece of Scipio Clint.

Former British Conservative Member of Parliament Dr. Charles Goodson-Wickes is Frank Fox's great-grandson and literary executor.

Bibliography

 1902 - Bushman and Buccaneer: a memoir of Harry Morant, Frank Renar, HT Dunn, Australia
 1908 - From the Old Dog, Lothian, Melbourne, Australia
 1909 - The Australian Crisis; written under the pseudonym of CH Kirmess.
 1910 - Australia (Illustrations by Percy Spence) Black
 1910 - Ramparts of Empire; a view of the Navy from an Imperial Standpoint, Black
 1911 - Australia; Peeps at many lands, Black via gutenberg.org
 1911 - The British Empire: peeps at many lands, (new 1915; 2nd 1929)
 1911 - Oceania; Peeps at many lands, Black, new edition 1915
 1912 - Problems of the Pacific, Williams and Norgate via gutenberg.org
 1912 - The Tyranny of Trade Unions, Eveleigh Nash
 1913 - Naturalist in Cannibal Land, AS Meek (Ed. F Fox) Fisher, Unwin
 1913 - Our English Land Muddle; an Australian view, Nelson
 1915 - The Balkan Peninsular, Black via gutenberg.org
 1915 - The Agony of Belgium: (being Phase 1 of the Great War), Hutchinson  (republished in 2014 by Charles Goodson-Wickes, Great Grandson and Literary Executor of Sir Frank Fox.)  Reviewed July 2016 in The Guards Magazine.
 1915 - Bulgaria, Black via gutenberg.org
 1914 - England, Black via gutenberg.org
 1915 - Italy, Black
 1914 - Switzerland, Black via gutenberg.org
 1918 - The Battle of the Ridges; Arras, Messiness (March–June 1917) Pearson
 1918 - The British Army at War, Unwin
 1920 - "GHQ" (Montreuil-sur-mer), "GSO" P Allan. (French edition republished in 2015. English Edition in 2016 by Charles Goodson-Wickes, Great Grandson and Literary Executor of Sir Frank Fox.)  Reviewed in The Times on 16/7/16 as one of the six best War Reads. Reviewed July 2016 in The Guards Magazine Reviewed in The RUSI Journal December 2016 Vol. 161 No. 6 pp. 58.63]
 1922 - The King's Pilgrimage, Hodder & Stoughton  (Sir Frank Fox accompanying George V and Field Marshal Earl Haig to opening of Belgian & French Military Cemeteries 1922.) – to be republished 2017
 1923 - The History of the Royal Gloucestershire Hussars Yeomanry 1898 - 1922 (The Great Cavalry Campaign in Palestine), P Allan
 1923 - Beneath an Ardent Sun, Hodder & Stoughton
 1923 - The English 1909–1922; a gossip, Murray
 1924 - The British Empire Exhibition, Wembley, Official Guide, in collaboration with Grant Cook
 1926 - Finland Today, Black; new edition 1928
 1927 - Italy Today, H Jenkins
 1928 - The Mastery of the Pacific: can the British Empire and the United States agree? Seams, NY 1928
 1928 - The Royal Inniskilling Fusiliers in the World War, Constable
 1930 - Parliamentary Government - a failure, S Paul
 1937 - The Royal House of Windsor 1837-1937 (edited), Royal Warrant Holders Association
 1951 - The Royal Inniskilling Fusiliers in the Second World War, 1939–45

References

External links

 
 
 C. H. Kirmess (pseudonym) at The Encyclopedia of Science Fiction

1874 births
1960 deaths
Alumni of Christ's College, Cambridge
Writers from Adelaide
Australian journalists
Australian soldiers
Australian Officers of the Order of the British Empire
Australian Knights Bachelor
Australian emigrants to the United Kingdom